This page shows the progress of Cheltenham Town F.C. in the 2010–11 football season. This year they played their games in League Two in the English league system.

Results

League Two

FA Cup

League Cup

Football League Trophy

Football League Two

League table

Results summary

Results by round

Appearances and goals
As of 6 May 2011.
(Substitute appearances in brackets)

Awards

Transfers

References

Cheltenham Town F.C. seasons
Cheltenham Town